The deep cerebral veins are a group of veins in the head.

This group includes the superior thalamostriate vein.

Veins of the head and neck